Rineke Dijkstra HonFRPS (born 2 June 1959) is a Dutch photographer. She lives and works in Amsterdam. Dijkstra has been awarded an Honorary Fellowship of the Royal Photographic Society, the 1999 Citibank Private Bank Photography Prize (now Deutsche Börse Photography Prize) and the 2017 Hasselblad Award.

Early life and education
Dijkstra was born June 2, 1959, in Sittard, the Netherlands. She attended the Gerrit Rietveld Academie in Amsterdam from 1981 to 1986. She then spent a few years working commercially, taking corporate portraits and images for annual reports.

Work
Dijkstra concentrates on single portraits, and usually works in series, looking at groups such as adolescents, clubbers, and soldiers, from the Beach Portraits of 1992 and on, to the video installation Buzzclub/Mysteryworld (1996–1997), Tiergarten Series (1998–2000), Israeli soldiers (1999–2000), and the single-subject portraits in serial transition: Almerisa (1994–2005), Shany (2001–2003), Olivier (2000–2003), and Park Portraits (2005–2006). Her subjects are often shown standing, facing the camera, against a minimal background. This compositional style is evident in her beach portraits, which generally feature one or more adolescents against a seascape. This style is again seen in her studies of women who have just given birth.

Dijkstra dates her artistic awakening to a 1991 self-portrait. Taken with a 4×5 inch view camera after she had emerged from a swimming pool — therapy to recover from a bicycle accident — it presents her in a state of near-collapse. Commissioned by a Dutch newspaper to make photographs based on the notion of summertime, she then took photographs of adolescent bathers. This project resulted in Beach Portraits (1992–94), a series of full-length, nearly life-size color photographs of teenagers and slightly younger children taken at the water's edge in the United States, Poland, Britain, Ukraine, and Croatia. The series brought her to international prominence after it was exhibited in 1997 in the annual show of new photography at the Museum of Modern Art in New York; in 1999, the museum showed Odessa, Ukraine, August 4, 1993, a color photograph of a teenage boy on a beach, next to Cézanne's Male Bather (1885–1887).

Begun during Dijkstra's residency at the DAAD, Berlin in 1998–1999, the Tiergarten series (1998–2000) shows portraits of adolescent girls and boys photographed in the Tiergarten park in Berlin, as well as in another park in Lithuania. Another series of works was commissioned by the Anne Frank Foundation in Amsterdam for their new building: portraits of adolescent schoolgirls with their best friends, a poignant reminder that any girl could be an "Anne Frank" in unlucky circumstances. These portraits were primarily taken in Berlin, though Dijkstra later expanded her subjects to include Milan, Barcelona, and Paris.

During a project documenting refugees, six-year-old Almerisa, whose family fled Bosnia, asked Dijkstra to take her photo. Almerisa was photographed approximately every two years. Firstly, at an asylum centre as a young child on March 14, 1994. The last photograph of the Almerisa series was taken on June 19, 2008. Thus began Dijkstra's serial project, tracing her subject's transitions through both adolescence and relocation from East to West Europe. Dijkstra uses flash along with a reduction of colour in this Almerisa series. She declutters the room completely so it is void of any superfluous details such as furniture and pictures on the wall. This provides a blank background. This technique is also used in other series, e.g. Beach Portraits.

One later series shows a young Israeli woman, Shany, in the series Israeli Soldiers (1999–2003) at stages over the course of a year and a half, is shown at her induction, twice more in her soldier uniform, and at home after leaving the army.

The Olivier series (2000–03) follows a young man, Olivier Silva, from his enlistment with the French Foreign Legion through the years of his service in Corsica, Gabon, Côte d'Ivoire and Djibouti, showing his development, both physically and psychologically, into a soldier. For the series Park Portraits (2003–06), Dijkstra photographed children, adolescents, and teenagers momentarily suspending their varied activities to stare into the lens from scenic spots in Amsterdam's Vondelpark, Brooklyn's Prospect Park, Madrid's El Parque del Retiro, and Xiamen’s Amoy Botanical Garden, among others.

Filmed in Russia and commissioned by Manifesta 2014, the video portrait Marianna (The Fairy Doll) shows a young classical dancer rehearsing in a St Petersburg studio as she prepares to audition for a place at the Vaganova Academy of Russian Ballet.

Dijkstra uses a Japanese 4×5 inch view camera, with a standard lens on a tripod, and a flash on another tripod behind it. Even when she photographed children on the beach she used this same setup, with a portable flash to reduce contrast and bring the faces slightly out of deep shadow, modulating the sunlight. However, daylight is always her main light source. In 1998 she started to print her photographs at the Grieger Photo Lab in Düsseldorf, Germany, two and a half hours by train from Amsterdam, where Thomas Struth and Andreas Gursky, among other European art photographers of large-scale prints, work.

Dijkstra has also experimented with video in works such as the two-channel projection The Buzzclub, Liverpool, UK/Mysteryworld, Zaandam, NL (1996–1997), Ruth Drawing Picasso, Tate Liverpool, UK (2009), the four-channel installation The Krazyhouse (Megan, Simon, Nicky, Philip, Dee), Liverpool, UK, (2009), and the three-screen video piece I See a Woman Crying (Weeping Woman) (2009-2010). For The Buzzclub, Liverpool, UK/Mysteryworld, Zaandam, NL, Dijkstra visited two nightclubs, the first in Liverpool, dominated by 15-year-old working-class girls; the second, in the Netherlands, a hangout for working-class boys with shaved heads, wearing matching hip-hop outfits. She set up studios in the clubs and asked volunteers to dance one at a time in front of the camera, the contrast between the girls and boys, each assertive and vulnerable in equal proportion, being a subject of the video. She made another video in 1997, Annemiek, which showed a shy, Dutch teenager singing a Backstreet Boys’ song karaoke style. For Ruth Drawing Picasso, Dijkstra simply trained the camera on an English schoolgirl as she sat on the floor, intently sketching a portrait of Dora Maar at Tate Liverpool.  In I See a Woman Crying (Weeping Woman), Dijkstra used Picasso's The Weeping Woman (1937) in the Tate Liverpool as the distraction device for a group of English schoolchildren, who were asked to describe what they saw in the painting which never appears on screen.

Exhibitions
Dijkstra's photographs have appeared in numerous international exhibitions, including the 1997 and 2001 Venice Biennale, the 1998 Bienal de Sao Paulo, Turin's Biennale Internationale di Fotografia in 1999, and the 2003 International Center for Photography's Triennial of Photography and Video in New York.

Solo exhibitions in 1998 were held at Museum Boymans-van Beuningen, Rotterdam, the Sprengel Museum, Hannover, and Museum Folkwang, Essen. In 1999, Dijkstra's work was exhibited at MACBA, Barcelona. In 2001, exhibitions were held at the Frans Hals Museum (De Hallen), Haarlem, The Netherlands and the Herzliya Museum of Contemporary Art, Israel. In 2005–2006 a travelling exhibition Rineke Dijkstra: Portraits was shown at Jeu de Paume, Paris and at Fotomuseum Winterthur, La Caixa, Barcelona, and Rudolfinum, Prague.

In the United States, Dijkstra has had solo exhibitions at the Art Institute of Chicago (2001), the Institute of Contemporary Art, Boston (2001) and LaSalle Bank, Chicago (2004). A comprehensive exhibition of her work, Rineke Dijkstra: A Retrospective, was organised by the San Francisco Museum of Modern Art (SFMOMA) and New York's Solomon R. Guggenheim Museum in 2012. Bringing together more than 70 color photographs and 5 video works, the exhibition showed in 2012 at SFMOMA then at the Solomon R. Guggenheim Museum.

Awards
1987: Kodak Award Nederland
1993: Art Encouragement Award Amstelveen
1994: Werner Mantz Award
1998: 1999 Citibank Private Bank Photography Prize (now Deutsche Börse Photography Prize)
2002/2003: Wexner Center Residency Award recipient in media arts
2009: Artist in residence at the Atlantic Center for the Arts, New Smyrna Beach, Florida
2011: Honorary Doctorate from the Royal College of Art, London
2012: Honorary Fellowship of the Royal Photographic Society
2017: Winner of the Hasselblad Award, with a prize of €100,000.

Collections
Dijkstra's work is held in the following permanent collections:
Tate, London
Museum of Modern Art, New York
Metropolitan Museum of Art, New York
Guggenheim Museum, New York
Jewish Museum (Manhattan), New York
Albright-Knox Art Gallery, Buffalo, NY
Los Angeles County Museum of Art
Museum of Contemporary Art, Chicago
Art Institute of Chicago
San Francisco Museum of Modern Art
Walker Art Center, Minneapolis
Pérez Art Museum Miami
Museum of Fine Arts, Boston
 of Lugano
Baltimore Museum of Art
Museum De Pont, Tilburg

Publications
Portraits. Munich: Schirmer/Mosel, 2005. .
The Krazy House. Frankfurt: Museum für Moderne Kunst, 2013. . Exhibition catalogue. Depicts all of her video installations since 1996, and other photographs of young people. Text in English and German.

References

External links

Rineke Dijkstra Artist Page at Sommer Contemporary Art Gallery Website
Rineke Dijkstra at the National Gallery of Art
Rineke Dijkstra at the Deutsche Börse Photography Foundation

1959 births
Living people
People from Sittard
Dutch women photographers
Dutch contemporary artists
20th-century Dutch photographers
21st-century Dutch photographers
20th-century women photographers
21st-century women photographers
Royal Photographic Society members
20th-century Dutch women